Todd Bates (born 2 March 1983) is an Australian former professional rugby league footballer who played in the 2000s. He played for the Newcastle Knights in 2003.

Post Rugby League career Todd forged a successful career in the mining industry with UGM Mining Services.

References

External links
http://www.rugbyleagueproject.org/players/Todd_Bates/summary.html

1983 births
Living people
Australian rugby league players
Cessnock Goannas players
Newcastle Knights players
Place of birth missing (living people)
Rugby league halfbacks